Hermalle-sous-Huy is a district of the municipality of Engis, located in the province of Liège in Wallonia, Belgium.

During the Middle Ages, Hermalle-sous-Huy was the site of a court of law. The  is located in Hermalle-sous-Huy. The centre of the settlement also contains several other historical buildings, including the birthplace of master mason , which contains some murals depicting the work of masons, unique in Europe.

References

External links

Populated places in Liège Province